Terranova was a German television channel based on nature and ecology.

History of the channel
Terranova was launched in September 2004 by AB Groupe to replace the German music channel Onyx.tv. The channel was finally stopped on 10 July 2007 .

Organisation

Managers
Director general : 
 Ludi Boeken

Budget
Terranova was owned by ONYX Television GmbH, funded 100% by AB Groupe.

Programmes
The channel showed a number of documentaries around animals and nature and the environment.

Shows
 Cohn-Bendit trifft... : Talk show of one hour, presented by Daniel Cohn-Bendit on political, ecological, and economic news.
 Green Planet : Magazine based on ecology.

References

External links

Mediawan Thematics
Defunct television channels in Germany
Television channels and stations established in 2004
Television channels and stations disestablished in 2007
2004 establishments in Germany
2007 disestablishments in Germany